Ziwang (born July 14, 1991, China, Tianjin) is a Chinese actress and model.

She is an Internet celebrity, book writer who is popular with her humorous clips, appeared on Kuai GIF (Chinese GIF apps) in 2013, so far by June 2016, she has attracted 1.36 million fans on Kuai GIF.
On Sina Weibo, Ziwang is also widely acclaimed, by September 2016, she has over two million fans.
In 2015, she was recruited by a talent group "Miss Like" by Like Media and made appearances in many commercials films and television.
May, 2017, as an actress, she participated in shooting Joker Xue's new released single mv  <Ambiguous Love (暧昧)>.
September, 2017, she attended the Zhejiang TV show as an honour guest.

Filmography

Film

Television

Music video appearances

Works

Collections
 《痴心见多了，就喜欢你》". (June, 2017)

Action
 November, 2015, Ziwang is the representative of Miss Like attending the Golive Global Ceremony.
 December, 2015,  she participated in the big star show program "Who am I" by Youku.
 February, 2017,  she got champion in the "Who's Still Standing?" 一站到底 by Jiangsu Television.
May,2017,  as an actress, she participated in shooting Joker Xue's new released single mv  "<Ambiguous Love (暧昧)>".
 September, 2017,  she attend in the TV show program "向上吧诗词" by Zhejiang Television.

References

Links
子望's SinaWeibo 
子望's Instagram 
子望's Baidu’s online user forum 

1991 births
Living people
Chinese film actresses
Chinese television actresses
21st-century Chinese actresses